Donald J. Darensbourg is an American inorganic chemist. He is a distinguished professor of chemistry at Texas A&M University. He was elected a member of the National Academy of Sciences in 2022.

Education
Born in Baton Rouge, Louisiana, in 1941, Darensbourg obtained a BS from California State University in 1964, followed by a PhD from University of Illinois Urbana-Champaign in 1968 under the guidance of Theodore L. Brown.

Career
Darensbourg started work as a research chemist at Texaco Research Center in 1968. In 1969, he was appointed assistant professor at the State University of New York at Buffalo. In 1973, he taught at Tulane University, eventually attaining the rank of professor. In 1982, Donald Darensbourg moved to Texas A&M University with Marcetta Y. Darensbourg. He was awarded the title of Distinguished Professor in 2010.

Darensbourg's research interests include using carbon dioxide as monomer and solvent in the production of biodegradable copolymers.

References

External links
Voices of Inorganic Chemistry Interview - Donald J. Darensbourg and Marcetta Y. Darensbourg (YouTube link)

Further reading
 

21st-century American chemists
Inorganic chemists
Texas A&M University faculty
1941 births
Living people
Members of the United States National Academy of Sciences